Nicole Kriz (born 13 December 1983) is a retired Australian tennis player. Her career-high WTA doubles ranking is No. 104, achieved on 9 July 2007. Her career-high singles ranking is world No. 332, which she reached on 4 August 2008.

Early life
Kriz was born on 13 December 1983, in Bankstown, New South Wales, Australia, to Mike and Seija Kriz. She was educated at the Presbyterian Ladies' College, Sydney, in Croydon, leaving at the end of Year 10, in 1999, to focus on her tennis career.

Kriz won the $25k Australian Challenger event in Berri, beating top-100 player Marina Erakovic in the final. She also defeated the No. 2 seed Monique Adamczak in the semifinals. Both wins were by third set tiebreakers.

Kriz retired in 2010.

WTA career finals

Doubles: 1 (runner-up)

ITF Circuit finals

Singles: 3 (2 titles, 1 runner-up)

Doubles: 35 (23 titles, 12 runner-ups)

WTA doubles highlights
 2007 – SF Tier IV Prague, Czech Republic w/  Leanne Baker
 2007 – QF Tier IV Fes, Morocco w/  Leanne Baker
 2007 – QF Tier III Acapulco, Mexico w/  Leanne Baker
 2007 – QF Tier III Bogotá, Colombia w/  Leanne Baker
 2007 – QF Tier IV Auckland, New Zealand w/  Leanne Baker

Top five career singles wins
 138–  Samantha Stosur  – 2003
 150–  Marina Erakovic  – 2008
 168–  Melanie South  – 2006
 173–  Monique Adamczak  – 2008
 181–  Junri Namigata  – 2008

See also
 List of Old Girls of PLC Sydney

References
 ITF statistics

External links
 
 
 
 Official site for September 2007 Tokyo $50k. Includes Full Matches & Photos
 October 2006: Troy USA $50k Double Final – Kriz/Baker vs Scheepers/N.Uberoi

1983 births
Living people
Australian female tennis players
People educated at the Presbyterian Ladies' College, Sydney
Sportswomen from New South Wales
Tennis players from Sydney